Bonvesin da la Riva (sometimes Italianized in spelling Bonvesino or Buonvicino;  1240 – c. 1313) was a well-to-do Milanese lay member of the Ordine degli Umiliati (literally, "Order of the Humble Ones"), a teacher of (Latin) grammar and a notable Lombard poet and writer of the 13th century, giving one of the first known examples of the written Lombard language. He is often described as the "father" of the Lombard language.

He taught in Legnano and in Milan. His De magnalibus urbis Mediolani ("On the Marvels of Milan"), written in the late spring of 1288, languished unknown in a single manuscript in the Biblioteca Nacional de España, Madrid, until 1894.  Its eight chapters form a monument of civic pride typical of the Italian communes, written by a man in a position to offer an unrivalled statistical report of the city that he felt was exalted above all others, like the eagle among birds. In Milan, he counted the belltowers (120) and the portoni, massive front doors of houses (12,500), the city's lawyers (120), physicians (28), ordinary surgeons (at least 150), butchers (440) and communal trumpeters (6). His order, the Umiliati, served as a kind of civil service in Milan, collecting taxes and controlling the communal treasury, so he was in a position to know.  His long inventory of the fruits and vegetables that Milanesi were eating served as a rare source of ordinary fare for the historian of cuisine, as his verses De quinquaginta curialitatibus ad mensam ("Fifty courtesies at Table"), written in the Lombard language for the instruction of those not proficient in Latin, serve the historian of table manners.

Other works 
In Latin except where noted.
Liber di Tre Scricciur (Lombard language)
Disputatio musce cum formica
Disputatio rosae cum viola
De vulgare de elymosinis
Laudes de Virgine Maria

Notes

External links
 

1240 births
1313 deaths
Italian poets
Italian male poets
Western Lombard language